Thomisus granulifrons is a species of spiders of the genus Thomisus. It is native to India and Sri Lanka.

References

Spiders described in 1906
Thomisidae
Arthropods of India
Spiders of Asia